Águila Roja is a Spanish adventure television series set in Spain during the 17th century. It was produced by Globomedia for Televisión Española and was broadcast on La 1 of Televisión Española from 2009 to 2016. It is one of the channel's most successful shows, and its rights have been sold to several countries.

The aim of the show was to capitalize on the success of Televisión Española's period dramas such as Cuéntame cómo pasó, La Señora or Amar en tiempos revueltos, but at the same time aiming for mature audiences with a masked hero in the style of Zorro or Green Arrow as the main character. Many of the latter shows carry warnings that they are for mature audiences only.

Synopsis
The series begins in 1660 and follows Gonzalo de Montalvo (David Janer), a school teacher who trained as a ninja while exiled in Japan as he traveled through Asia during his youth, said to be the illegitimate son of reigning king Philip IV, as he becomes Águila Roja in an attempt to expose the assassin of his wife and avenge her death, which usually includes foiling plots against the monarchy planned by a secret society known as "La Logia" ("The Lodge"), amongst whose members are Lucrecia (Miryam Gallego), Marquise of Santillana, and Hernán Mejías (Francis Lorenzo), Commissioner in the Village of Madrid.

Cast

Awards and nominations

References

2009 Spanish television series debuts
2016 Spanish television series endings
Television shows set in Spain
Spanish adventure television series
La 1 (Spanish TV channel) network series
Television shows filmed in Spain
Television series set in the 17th century
2000s Spanish drama television series
2010s Spanish drama television series
Television series about revenge
Television series by Globomedia